The Banu Qaynuqa (also spelled Banu Kainuka, Banu Kaynuka, Banu Qainuqa, Banu Qaynuqa) was one of the three main Jewish tribes living in the 7th century of Medina, now in Saudi Arabia. The great-grandfather of Banu Qaynuqa tribe is Qaynuqa ibn Amchel ibn Munshi ibn Yohanan ibn Benjamin ibn Saron ibn Naphtali ibn Hayy ibn Musa and they are descendant of Manasseh ibn Yusuf ibn Yaqub ibn Ishaq son of Ibrahim. In 624, they were expelled during the Invasion of Banu Qaynuqa, after breaking the treaty known as the Constitution of Medina.

Background
In the 7th century, the Banu Qaynuqa were living in two fortresses in the south-western part of the city of Yathrib, now Medina, having settled there at an unknown date. Although the Banu Qaynuqa bore mostly Arabic names, they were both ethnically and religiously Jewish. They owned no land, earned their living through commerce and craftsmanship, including goldsmithery. The marketplace of Yathrib was located in the area of the town where the Qaynuqa lived. The Banu Qaynuqa were allied with the local Arab tribe of Khazraj and supported them in their conflicts with the rival Arab tribe of Aws.

Arrival of Muhammad
In May 622, Muhammad arrived at Yatrib now called Medina with a group of his followers, who were given shelter by members of all indigenous tribes of the city who came to be known as the Ansar. He proceeded to set about the establishment of a pact, known as the Constitution of Medina, between the Muslims, the Ansar, and the various Jewish tribes of Yathrab to regulate the matters of governance of the city, as well as the extent and nature of inter-community relations. Conditions of the pact, according to traditional Muslim sources, included boycotting the Quraysh, abstinence from "extending any support to them", assistance of one another if attacked by a third party, as well as "defending Medina, in case of a foreign attack".

The nature of this document as recorded by Ibn Ishaq and transmitted by Ibn Hisham is the subject of dispute among modern historians many of whom maintain that this "treaty" is possibly a collage of agreements, oral rather than written, of different dates, and that it is not clear when they were made or with whom.

Expulsion

In December 623, Muslims led by Muhammad defeated the Meccans of the Banu Quraish tribe in the Battle of Badr. Ibn Ishaq writes that a dispute broke out between the Muslims and the Banu Qaynuqa (the allies of the Khazraj tribe) soon afterward. When a Muslim woman visited a jeweler's shop in the Qaynuqa marketplace, she was molested. The goldsmith, a Jew, pinned her clothing such that, upon getting up, some portion of her legs became naked. A Muslim man coming upon the resulting commotion killed the shopkeeper in retaliation. A mob of Jews from the Qaynuqa tribe then pounced on the Muslim man and killed him. This escalated to a chain of revenge killings, and enmity grew between Muslims and the Banu Qaynuqa.

Traditional Muslim sources view these episodes as a violation of the Constitution of Medina. Muhammad himself regarded this as casus belli. Western historians, however, do not find in these events the underlying reason for Muhammad's attack on the Qaynuqa. According to F.E. Peters, the precise circumstances of the alleged violation of the Constitution of Medina are not specified in the sources. According to Fred Donner, available sources do not elucidate the reasons for the expulsion of the Qaynuqa. Donner argues that Muhammad turned against the Qaynuqa because as artisans and traders, the latter were in close contact with Meccan merchants. Weinsinck views the episodes cited by the Muslim historians, like the story of the Jewish goldsmith, as having no more than anecdotal value. He writes that the Jews had assumed a contentious attitude towards Muhammad and as a group possessing substantial independent power, they posed a great danger. Wensinck thus concludes that Muhammad, strengthened by the victory at Badr, soon resolved to eliminate the Jewish opposition to himself. Norman Stillman also believes that Muhammad decided to move against the Jews of Medina after being strengthened in the wake of the Battle of Badr.

Muhammad then approached the Banu Qaynuqa, gathering them in the marketplace and addressing them as follows,

To which the tribe replied,

Shibli Nomani and Safi al-Mubarakpuri view this response as a declaration of war. According to the Muslim tradition, verses 3:10-13 of the Qur'an were revealed to Muhammad following the exchange. Muhammad then besieged the Banu Qaynuqa for fourteen or fifteen days, according to ibn Hisham, after which the tribe surrendered unconditionally. It was certain, according to Watt, that there was some sort of negotiations. At the time of the siege, the Qaynuqa had a fighting force of 700 men, 400 of whom were armored. Watt concludes, that Muhammad could not have besieged such a large force so successfully without Qaynuqa's allies' support.

After the surrender of Banu Qaynuqa, Abdullah ibn Ubayy, the chief of a section of the clan of Khazraj̲ pleaded for them. According to Ibn Ishaq:

According to William Montgomery Watt, Abd-Allah ibn Ubayy was attempting to stop the expulsion, and Muhammad's insistence was that the Qaynuqa must leave the city, but was prepared to be lenient about other conditions; Ibn Ubayy argument was that presence of Qaynuqa with 700 fighting men can be helpful in the view of the expected Meccan onslaught. Because of this interference and other episodes of his discord with Muhammad, Abdullah ibn Ubayy earned for himself the title of the leader of hypocrites (munafiqun) in the Muslim tradition.

Aftermath

The Banu Qaynuqa left first for the Jewish colonies in the Wadi al-Kura, north of Medina, and from there to Der'a in Syria, west of Salkhad. In the course of time, they assimilated with the Jewish communities, pre-existing in that area, strengthening them numerically.

Muhammad divided the property of the Banu Qaynuqa, including their arms and tools, among his followers, taking for the Islamic state a fifth share of the spoils for the first time. Some members of the tribe chose to stay in Medina and convert to Islam. One man from the Banu Qaynuqa, Abdullah ibn Salam, became a devout Muslim. Although some Muslim sources claim that he converted immediately after Muhammad's arrival to Medina, modern scholars give more credence to the other Muslim sources, which indicate that 8 years later, 630, was the year of ibn Salam's conversion.

See also
 Banu Nadir
 Banu Qurayza
 Jihad
 Rules of war in Islam

References

Notes
 Encyclopaedia of Islam. Ed. P. Bearman et al., Leiden: Brill, 1960-2005.
 Ben-Zvi, Yitzhak. The Exiled and the Redeemed. Jewish Publication Society, 1957.
 Donner, Fred M. "Muhammad's Political Consolidation in Arabia up to the Conquest of Mecca". Muslim World 69: 229-247, 1979.
 Firestone, Reuven. Jihad: The Origin of Holy War in Islam. Oxford University Press, 1999. 
 Guillaume, A. The Life of Muhammad: A Translation of Ibn Ishaq's Sirat Rasul Allah. Oxford University Press, 1955. 
 
 
 Stillman, Norman. The Jews of Arab Lands: A History and Source Book. Philadelphia: Jewish Publication Society of America, 1979. 
 
 

Hejazi Jews
Muhammad and Judaism
Jews in the medieval Islamic world